Harold Shaw or Harry Shaw  may refer to:

Harold Shaw (American football) (born 1974), professional American football fullback 
Harold Shaw (racing driver) (1906–1941), retired American race car driver from Indianapolis
Harold Watkins Shaw (1911–1996),  British musicologist and educator
Harold M. Shaw (1877–1926), American film director

See also
Harry Shaw (disambiguation)